The Chicago and North Western Depot is a former railway station in Reedsburg, Wisconsin, which has been on the National Register of Historic Places since 1984. The station served the Chicago and North Western Railway along the Twin Cities 400 line for much of its life. It was built in 1906, and operated as a passenger station until closing in 1963. Currently, it houses the Reedsburg Chamber of Commerce and the headquarters for the 400 State Trail. The railway line, however, remains in use by Wisconsin and Southern Railroad.

References

Railway stations on the National Register of Historic Places in Wisconsin
National Register of Historic Places in Sauk County, Wisconsin
Reedsburg
Former railway stations in Wisconsin
Charles Sumner Frost buildings
Neoclassical architecture in Wisconsin
Brick buildings and structures
Railway stations in the United States opened in 1906
Railway stations closed in 1963
Reedsburg, Wisconsin